Croce is an Italian surname meaning literally "cross". Notable people with the surname include:

A. J. Croce (born 1971), American singer-songwriter
Alberto Croce (born 1944), Italian professional golfer
Alessandro Croce (1650–1704), Italian prelate
Andrea Giuseppe Croce (1914–1986), Italian businessman
Antonio Croce (born 1986) Italian footballer
Arlene Croce (born 1934), American dance critic
Baldassare Croce (1558–1628), Italian painter
Benedetto Croce (1866–1952), Italian philosopher and critic
Carlo M. Croce (born 1944), Italian-American oncologist
Carlo Croce (born 1945), Italian yacht racer
Daniele Croce (born 1982), Italian footballer
Fabiano Santacroce (born 1986), Italian Brazilian association football player
Francesco Croce (1696–1773), Italian baroque architect
Fulvio Croce (1901–1977), Italian lawyer
Giovanni Croce (1557–1609), Italian composer
Giovanni Andrea Croce (died 1595), Italian prelate
Giulio Cesare Croce (1550–1609), Italian playwright
Ingrid Croce (born 1947), American singer-songwriter and wife of Jim
Ireneo della Croce (1625–1713), Italian preacher
Jim Croce (1943–1973), American singer-songwriter
Luigi Croce (born 1940), Italian yacht racer
Marcos Croce (1894–1978), Argentine footballer
Maria Eufrasia della Croce (1597–1676), Italian nun and painter
Mary Keating Croce (1928–2016), American politician
Nicolás Emanuel Croce (born 1985), Argentine footballer
Onofrio de Santa Croce (died 1471), Italian cardinal
Paola Croce (born 1978), Italian volleyball player
Pat Croce (born 1954), Italian-American entrepreneur
Pellegrino Croce (born 1955), Italian rower
Stefania Croce (born 1970), Italian professional golfer

Italian-language surnames